Belturbet was a constituency represented in the Irish House of Commons from 1611 to 1800.

In the Patriot Parliament of 1689 summoned by James II, Belturbet was represented with two members.

Between 1725 and 1793 Catholics and those married to Catholics could not vote. It was in the control of the Earl of Lanesborough. The borough was disenfranchised under the terms of the Acts of Union 1800.

Members of Parliament, 1613–1801
1613–1615 Sir Hugh Wirrall and George Grimesditch
1634–1635  Sir Arthur Blundell and Sir William Ryves
1639–1649 John Borlase, later Lord Justice of Ireland and Richard Ashe (expelled 1642)
1661–1666 Stephen Butler (died and replaced 1662 by Francis Butler) and Thomas Warsopp

1689–1801

Notes

References

Bibliography

Constituencies of the Parliament of Ireland (pre-1801)
Historic constituencies in County Cavan
1614 establishments in Ireland
1800 disestablishments in Ireland
Constituencies established in 1614
Constituencies disestablished in 1800